Marquise Derell Goodwin (born November 19, 1990) is an American football wide receiver for the Seattle Seahawks of the National Football League (NFL). He also is an Olympian who competed in the long jump in track and field. He was drafted by the Buffalo Bills in the third round with the 78th pick of the 2013 NFL Draft. He played college football at Texas.

In track and field, his specialty is the long jump, an event in which he won two national college championships. Goodwin represented the United States at the 2008 IAAF World junior championships, the 2011 World University games, the 2011 IAAF World Championships, the 2012 Summer Olympics, and the 2015 Pan American Games, where he won silver. He has competed as a long jumper and sprinter, and has been a top competitor in the 60 meters and 100 meters dashes, and the triple jump.

Early years
Goodwin was born in Lubbock, Texas. He attended Rowlett High School in Rowlett, Texas, and played high school football and competed in track and field for the Rowlett Eagles. He had the second fastest 100-meter time (10.24w) in the state, was the state champion in the triple jump and long jump, and was a member of the state title-winning 4×100-meter relay team.  He won seven Texas Class 5A state track and field championships while he was at Rowlett. He also finished first in the long jump at the 2008 World Junior Championships in Athletics in Bydgoszcz, Poland, and first again at the 2008 and 2009 United States Junior Championships. At the 2009 USA Outdoor Track and Field Championships, Goodwin set the national high school record in the long jump and placed fifth.

In his high school career, he caught 132 passes for 1,709 yards (12.95 average) and 17 touchdowns.

College career
Goodwin received an athletic scholarship to attend the University of Texas at Austin, where he pledged Kappa Alpha Psi fraternity. He played for coach Mack Brown's Texas Longhorns football team from 2009 to 2012, and also competed for the Texas Longhorns track and field team from 2010 to 2012.

College track and field
Goodwin was a two-time NCAA champion in the long jump (2010, 2012) and a four-time All-American in track and field. He won five Big 12 Conference championships and made the All-Big 12 team seven times. He is the Longhorns' indoor record holder in the long jump and was the runner-up for the 2012 NCAA Indoor long jump title.

He won the 2011 U.S. Outdoor Track and Field long jump title with a personal-best  and won the 2012 Outdoor Championship/Olympic Trials with the same distance. He competed in the 2012 Olympics, ranking tied for the #1 qualifier, but only managed 10th place in the final.

He chose not to compete in the 2013 NCAA track and field seasons in indoor or outdoor.

College football
In his collegiate career, Goodwin started 21 of the 49 games in which he appeared, including the 2010 BCS National Championship Game against Alabama. His final career statistics included 116 receptions for 1,296 yards and six touchdowns, rushed 46 times for 405 yards and 44 kickoff returns for 985 yards and one touchdown. He also returned a punt for 22 yards. Some of his key plays include his first touchdown of his 2009 freshman year, a game-winning touchdown in a 16–13 victory over the Oklahoma Sooners.  Goodwin also returned a kickoff 95 yards for a touchdown to seal the Longhorns' win over the Texas A&M Aggies.

In the 2010 season, Goodwin had 31 receptions for 324 yards and one touchdown. In the 2011 season, he had 33 receptions for 421 yards and two touchdowns. In the 2012 season, Goodwin was named a semifinalist for the Campbell Trophy. In the 2012 Alamo Bowl against Oregon State, Goodwin rushed for a 64-yard touchdown, and caught the game-winning, 36-yard touchdown pass—an effort that was good enough to earn him the game's Offensive Most Valuable Player trophy. In the 2012 season, he had 26 receptions for 340 receiving yards and three receiving touchdowns.

Goodwin went on to compete in the 2013 NFLPA Collegiate Bowl.

College statistics

Professional career

After posting the third-fastest 40-yard dash time ever at the NFL scouting combine, Goodwin was drafted by the Buffalo Bills in the third round, with the 78th overall pick, of the 2013 NFL Draft.

Buffalo Bills
On May 10, 2013, Goodwin signed a four-year contract with the Bills, where he also practiced in his first day of rookie minicamp. He caught his first career touchdown Week 6 against the Cincinnati Bengals, a 40-yard pass from Thaddeus Lewis. Goodwin played 12 games in his rookie season making 17 receptions for 283 receiving yards. He also had 16 kickoff return opportunities totaling 351 returning yards.

In 2014, hobbled by numerous injuries (concussion, ankle, ribs, and hamstring), Goodwin caught only one pass for 42 yards, which came against the Detroit Lions.

After missing five games with broken ribs, Goodwin posted two receptions for 24 yards in the 2015 season.

In 2016, Goodwin posted 29 receptions, 431 yards, and three touchdowns, setting career highs in games played, receptions, and receiving yards. While Goodwin enjoyed his most productive season, he was also inconsistent. His 42.6% catch rate ranked 107th among qualified NFL wide receivers in 2016.

San Francisco 49ers

On March 9, 2017, Goodwin signed a two-year contract with the San Francisco 49ers. On September 10, 2017, in his 49ers debut, Goodwin had three receptions for 21 yards in the season opening 23–3 loss to the Carolina Panthers. On November 12, 2017, against the New York Giants, he caught his first touchdown of the season on an 83-yard reception. After beating one defender, Goodwin blew a kiss to the sky and once in the end zone, then took a knee in prayer before falling to both knees with his head in hands, as his teammates gathered around him. After the game, in which the 49ers beat the New York Giants for their first win of the season, Goodwin revealed that he and his wife had lost their prematurely born son due to complications during pregnancy in the early morning hours the day of the game. In Week 15, Goodwin caught a career-high 10 passes for 114 yards in a 25–23 win over the Titans. Goodwin established new career highs in receptions and receiving yards in his first season with the 49ers, finishing the season with 56 catches for 962 yards and two touchdowns.

On March 8, 2018, Goodwin signed a three-year, $20.3 million contract extension with the 49ers that would last through the 2021 season.

In Week 6, against the Green Bay Packers, Goodwin set career-highs with 126 yards and two touchdowns. In the 2018 season, he finished with 23 receptions for 395 yards and four touchdowns.

In 2019, Goodwin played in nine games before being placed on injured reserve on December 10, 2019. He finished the season with 12 receptions for 186 yards and a touchdown. Without Goodwin, the 49ers reached Super Bowl LIV, but lost 31–20 to the Kansas City Chiefs.

Philadelphia Eagles
On April 25, 2020, Goodwin was traded to the Philadelphia Eagles for a swap of sixth-round draft picks in the 2020 NFL Draft. After being traded to the Eagles, Goodwin agreed on a restructured contract on a one-year deal worth $1.35 million. On July 28, 2020, Goodwin announced he would opt out of the 2020 season due to the COVID-19 pandemic, and to focus more on his family.

San Francisco 49ers (second stint) 
On March 16, 2021, Goodwin reverted to the San Francisco 49ers due to stipulations from the trade with the Eagles, and the 49ers sent a seventh-round draft pick in the 2021 NFL Draft to the Eagles as part of the trade clause. The 49ers released him the next day.

Chicago Bears 
On April 16, 2021, Goodwin signed with the Chicago Bears. He ended the season with 20 receptions, 313 yards, and one touchdown.

Seattle Seahawks 
On May 23, 2022, Goodwin signed with the Seattle Seahawks. In Week 7, against the Los Angeles Chargers, Goodwin had two receiving touchdowns in the 37–23 victory. He played in 13 games with two starts, recording 27 catches for 387 yards and four touchdowns. Goodwin was placed on injured reserve on December 31, 2022, due to a shoulder injury.

NFL career statistics

Track career

Goodwin made the 2012 United States Olympic team in the long jump with a career-best and meet-best mark of 8.33m (27-04.25) at the US Olympic Team Trials, a jump that would have been good enough to win the gold medal at the following Olympics.

At the 2012 Summer Olympics, he qualified for the finals on his first jump of 8.11m (26-7), but he failed to match that performance in the finals and finished in 10th place.

In 2015, after a three-year absence, he returned to track and field. In his first event back, despite jumping a career best 8.37m (27-05.5), he finished in fourth place, just missing qualification for the World Championship. A month later, at the 2015 Pan Am Games, he earned a silver medal with a jump of 8.27m (27-1).

In 2016, Goodwin won the long jump at the Rod McCravy Invitational in Kentucky and placed third in the Millrose Games in New York. In New York he also placed 6th in the 60m dash, with a then career best 6.68s. In March, he placed third at the United States Indoor Track and Field Championships while also making it to the semifinals in the 60-meter dash with another personal best. As of 2020, his personal best ranks him as the 46th best long jumper of all time. Then a month later, he won the long jump at the IAAF Diamond League meet in Birmingham, England. However, his dream of returning to the Olympics came up short when he finished a disappointing seventh at the Olympic Trials in July. His best jump of 8.25m was well below his best jumps of the year, which would have been enough to qualify.

In June 2021, Goodwin competed in the long jump field in the 2020 Olympic Trials. However, Goodwin was unable to qualify for the Games after placing 19th out of 24 jumpers with his best jump being a 24-foot, 10-inch leap.

Personal life
Goodwin is married to former Longhorn hurdler champion Morgan Snow-Goodwin. On November 12, 2017, their premature son died just hours prior to the 49ers' game against the New York Giants. In November 2018, Goodwin missed two games when he and his wife lost their unborn twin boys. Goodwin and his wife welcomed a daughter, Marae, on February 19, 2020. Goodwin is a cousin of former San Francisco 49ers teammate, Adrian Colbert.

References

External links

Seattle Seahawks bio
Texas Longhorns football bio
Marquise Goodwin's Twitter

1990 births
Living people
African-American male track and field athletes
African-American players of American football
American football wide receivers
American male long jumpers
Athletes (track and field) at the 2012 Summer Olympics
Athletes (track and field) at the 2015 Pan American Games
Buffalo Bills players
Chicago Bears players
Ed Block Courage Award recipients
Olympic track and field athletes of the United States
Pan American Games medalists in athletics (track and field)
Pan American Games silver medalists for the United States
People from Garland, Texas
People from Rowlett, Texas
Philadelphia Eagles players
Players of American football from Texas
San Francisco 49ers players
Seattle Seahawks players
Sportspeople from the Dallas–Fort Worth metroplex
Sportspeople from Lubbock, Texas
Texas Longhorns football players
Texas Longhorns men's track and field athletes
Track and field athletes from Texas
Track and field athletes in the National Football League
Universiade medalists in athletics (track and field)
Universiade silver medalists for the United States
USA Outdoor Track and Field Championships winners
Medalists at the 2011 Summer Universiade
Medalists at the 2015 Pan American Games
21st-century African-American sportspeople